Calocochlea  is a genus of large air-breathing land snails, pulmonate gastropod mollusks in the family Camaenidae.

Species

 Calocochlea albaiensis Sowerby I, 1841 
 Calocochlea amicta (Reeve, 1851)
 Calocochlea aopta (Clench & Archer, 1933)
 Calocochlea augusta (Albers, 1854)
 Calocochlea barnetti (Barnett, 1989)
 Calocochlea bruguieriana Pfeiffer, 1845 
 Calocochlea cailliaudi G. P. Deshayes, 1839 
 Calocochlea carbonaria Sowerby I, 1842 
 Calocochlea chlorochroa Sowerby I, 1841 
 Calocochlea chrysocheila Sowerby I, 1842 
 Calocochlea coccomelos Sowerby I, 1841 
 Calocochlea codonensis (Hidalgo, 1888)
 Calocochlea collodes Sowerby I, 1832 
 Calocochlea coronadoi J. Hidalgo, 1868 
 Calocochlea crossei (Hidalgo, 1887)
 Calocochlea cryptica W. J. Broderip, 1840 
 Calocochlea cumingi Pfeiffer, 1842 
 Calocochlea damahoyiPfeiffer, 1856 
 Calocochlea dattaensis (O. Semper, 1866)
 Calocochlea dautzenbergi (Hidalgo, 1901)
 Calocochlea dayritorum (Barnett, 1989)
 Calocochlea decipiens (G. B. Sowerby I, 1841)
 Calocochlea denticulata (Jay, 1839)
 Calocochlea depressa Semper, 1877 
 Calocochlea elerae O. F. von Möllendorff, 1896 
 Calocochlea erythrospira (Möllendorff, 1890)
 Calocochlea festiva Donavan, 1825 
 Calocochlea garibaldiana Dohrn & Semper, 1862 
 Calocochlea generalis Pfeiffer, 1854 
 Calocochlea gertrudis (Möllendorff, Kobelt & Winter, 1912)
 Calocochlea gilberti (Quadras & Möllendorff, 1896)
 Calocochlea harfordi W. J. Broderip, 1841 
 Calocochlea hemisphaerion (L. Pfeiffer, 1851)
 Calocochlea hidalgoi O. F. von Möllendorff, 1894 
 Calocochlea intorta Sowerby I, 1840 
 Calocochlea kobelti O. F. von Möllendorff, 1890 
 Calocochlea lalloensis (L. Pfeiffer, 1855)
 Calocochlea leucauchen O. F. von Möllendorff, 1895 
 Calocochlea libata (Reeve, 1851)
 Calocochlea lignaria (L. Pfeiffer, 1847)
 Calocochlea lignicolor (Möllendorff, 1888)
 Calocochlea lillianae P. Bartsch, 1932 
 Calocochlea luengoi (Hidalgo, 1888)
 Calocochlea magistra Pfeiffer, 1852 
 Calocochlea matruelis Sowerby I, 1841 
 Calocochlea melanocheila Valenciennes, 1840 
 Calocochlea melanorhaphe (Quadras & Möllendorff, 1896)
 Calocochlea metallora (Möllendorff, 1898)
 Calocochlea microspira (L. Pfeiffer, 1854)
 Calocochlea mindanaensis Sowerby I, 1842 
 Calocochlea moreleti Pfeiffer, 1848 
 Calocochlea norrissii Sowerby I, 1842 
 Calocochlea obtusa (L. Pfeiffer, 1845)
 Calocochlea pan W. J. Broderip, 1841 
 Calocochlea perpallida P. Bartsch, 1932 
 Calocochlea persimilis A. de Férussac, 1850 
 Calocochlea polillensis (L. Pfeiffer, 1861)
 Calocochlea ponderosa (L. Pfeiffer, 1845)
 Calocochlea princeps (Reeve, 1854)
 Calocochlea propitia Fulton, 1907 
 Calocochlea pulcherrima Sowerby I, 1841 
 Calocochlea pyrostoma A. de Férussac, 1821 
 Calocochlea retusa (L. Pfeiffer, 1845)
 Calocochlea roebeleni (Möllendorff, 1894)
 Calocochlea roissyana A. de Férussac, 1821 
 Calocochlea saranganica J. Hidalgo, 1887 
 Calocochlea schadenbergi O. F. von Möllendorff, 1890 
 Calocochlea semperi O. F. von Möllendorff, 1893 
 Calocochlea siquijorensis W. J. Broderip, 1841 
 Calocochlea sphaerion Sowerby I, 1841 
 Calocochlea streptostoma (Möllendorff, 1893)
 Calocochlea submirabilis O. F. von Möllendorff, 1897 
 Calocochlea suprabadia (C. Semper, 1877)
 Calocochlea trisculpta (Möllendorff, 1894)
 Calocochlea tukanensis Pfeiffer, 1871 
 Calocochlea valenciennesii Eydoux, 1838 
 Calocochlea weberi P. Bartsch, 1919 
 Calocochlea xanthobasis (Pilsbry, 1892)
 Calocochlea zebuensis W. J. Broderip, 1841 
 Calocochlea zonifera Pfeiffer, 1842

Species brought into synonymy
 Calocochlea cromyodes (L. Pfeiffer, 1843) : synonym of Calocochlea valenciennii (Eydoux, 1838) (junior synonym)
 Calocochlea luzonica Sowerby I, 1842 : synonym of Calocochlea pulcherrima (G. B. Sowerby I, 1841) (junior synonym)
 Calocochlea samarensis Semper, 1877: synonym of Calocochlea zonifera samarensis (C. Semper, 1877)
 Calocochlea sowerbyi (Hidalgo, 1896): synonym of Calocochlea decipiens (G. B. Sowerby I, 1841) (junior synonym)

References

External links
 Hartmann, J.D.W. (1840-1844). Erd- und Süsswasser-Gasteropoden der Schweiz. Mit Zugabe einiger merkwürdigen exotischen Arten, i-xx, 1-36, pl. 1-2 [30-06-1840]; 37-116, pl. 13-36 [1841]; 117-156, pl. 37-60 [1842]; 157-204, pl. 61-72 [1843]; 205-227, pl. 73-84 [1844]. St. Gallen.
Biolib
Zipcodezoo
Discover Life

Gastropod genera
Camaenidae